Calnexin (CNX) is a 67kDa integral protein (that appears variously as a 90kDa, 80kDa, or 75kDa band on western blotting depending on the source of the antibody) of the endoplasmic reticulum (ER). It consists of a large (50 kDa) N-terminal calcium-binding lumenal domain, a single transmembrane helix and a short (90 residues), acidic cytoplasmic tail.

Function 

Calnexin  is a chaperone, characterized by assisting protein folding and quality control, ensuring that only properly folded and assembled proteins proceed further along the secretory pathway. It specifically acts to retain unfolded or unassembled N-linked glycoproteins in the ER.

Calnexin binds only those N-glycoproteins that have GlcNAc2Man9Glc1 oligosaccharides. These monoglucosylated oligosaccharides result from the trimming of two glucose residues by the sequential action of two glucosidases, I and II. Glucosidase II can also remove the third and last glucose residue. If the glycoprotein is not properly folded, an enzyme called UGGT (for UDP-glucose:glycoprotein glucosyltransferase) will add the glucose residue back onto the oligosaccharide thus regenerating the glycoprotein's ability to bind to calnexin.  The improperly-folded glycoprotein chain thus loiters in the ER and the expression of EDEM/Htm1p  which eventually sentences the underperforming glycoprotein to degradation by removing one of the nine mannose residues. The mannose lectin Yos-9 (OS-9 in humans) marks and sorts misfolded glycoproteins for degradation. Yos-9 recognizes mannose residues exposed after α-mannosidase removal of an outer mannose of misfolded glycoproteins.

Calnexin associates with the protein folding enzyme ERp57 to catalyze glycoprotein specific disulfide bond formation and also functions as a chaperone for the folding of MHC class I α-chain in the membrane of the ER. As newly synthesized MHC class I α-chains enter the endoplasmic reticulum, calnexin binds on to them retaining them in a partly folded state.

After the β2-microglobulin binds to the MHC class I peptide-loading complex (PLC), calreticulin and ERp57 take over the job of chaperoning the MHC class I protein while the tapasin links the complex to the transporter associated with antigen processing (TAP) complex. This association prepares the MHC class I for binding an antigen for presentation on the cell surface.

A prolonged association of calnexin with mutant misfolded PMP22 known to cause Charcot-Marie-Tooth Disease leads to the sequestration, degradation and inability of PMP22 to traffic to the Schwann cell surface for myelination. After repeated rounds of calnexin binding, mutant PMP22 is modified by ubiquitin for degradation by the proteasome as well as a Golgi to ER retrieval pathway to return any misfolded PMP22 that escaped from the ER to the Golgi apparatus.

The x-ray crystal structure of calnexin revealed a globular lectin domain and a long hydrophobic arm extending out.

Cofactors 

ATP and calcium ions are cofactors involved in substrate binding for calnexin.

References

External links

Further reading 

 
 
 
 
 
 
 
 
 
 
 
 
 
 
 
 
 
 
 
 
 
 

Integral membrane proteins
C-type lectins
Molecular chaperones